Concordia High School is a private Christian high school in Pflugerville, Texas . The school is the only Lutheran high school in the greater Austin area.  Concordia High School prepares students to navigate a dynamic world
by building positive life defining relationships, equipping students to
think critically, and rooting their identity in Christ. CHS is noted for rigorous academics and Christ-centered learning focus.

The AP courses offered are: AP Calculus, AP Economics, AP Physics B, and AP US History. Dual credit classes are also offered and vary by year. Currently ten sports are offered: cheer, football, cross country, soccer, volleyball, basketball, baseball, tennis, golf, and track. Extracurricular activities include band, choir, drama, art, Science Olympiad, National Honor Society, yearbook, TAPPS academic competition, student council, and class retreats. Before the start of classes every August, the new freshman class goes to Camp Lone Star to ease the transition from middle to high school. Prom is hosted every year by the Junior class for the Juniors and Seniors to celebrate the end of the school year.

References 

Private high schools in Texas
High schools in Austin, Texas
Christian schools in Texas
2002 establishments in Texas
Educational institutions established in 2002